Jun Shuang Huang, also known as Junshuang Huang, is a Chinese professional ballet dancer who currently performs as a Guest International Principal Dancer with the Queensland Ballet. He was formerly a principal with the Guangzhou Ballet and the Houston Ballet.

Born in Shanghai, China, Huang trained at the Shanghai Dance School for seven years. He received a Special Jury Prize finalist award at the Prix de Lausanne International Dance Competition in Switzerland, a Junior Third award at the 2005 Asia-Pacific Ballet Competition in Japan, and a Junior Silver award the 2006 Taoli Cup Dance Competition in China.

In 2007, he joined the Guangzhou Ballet as a principal dancer. During that time he received awards from the 2008 Varna International Ballet Competition and the 2009 Helsinki International Ballet Competition. Huang joined Houston Ballet as a principal dancer in May 2010. He has also toured as a guest artist in the United States and Switzerland.

His repertoire includes ballets such as Swan Lake, La Bayadère, La Sylphide, Coppélia, Paquita, Le Corsaire, Don Quixote, and Diana and Actaeon.

Huang and his wife Xiaochen Chen, also a former dancer from the Guangzhou Ballet, operate the Huang Dance Studio in Houston.

References

External links 
 Huang Dance Studio
 Dancer Spotlight on Jun Shuang Huang

Chinese male ballet dancers
Houston Ballet principal dancers
Living people
People from Shanghai
1980s births